The 2015 Bucknell Bison football team represented Bucknell University in the 2015 NCAA Division I FCS football season. They were led by sixth-year head coach Joe Susan and played their home games at Christy Mathewson–Memorial Stadium. They were a member of the Patriot League. They finished the season 4–7, 1–5 in Patriot League play to finish in sixth place.

Schedule

Source: Schedule

Game summaries

Marist

Duquesne

at Cornell

at VMI

Lehigh

at Army

Georgetown

at Lafayette

at Fordham

Holy Cross

at Colgate

References

Bucknell
Bucknell Bison football seasons
Bucknell Bison football